St. Marys is a city in Warren County, Iowa, United States. The population was 108 at the time of the 2020 census.

St. Marys is part of the Des Moines–West Des Moines Metropolitan Statistical Area.

History
St. Marys (originally spelled St. Mary's with the apostrophe s) was laid out about 1870.

Geography
St. Marys is located at  (41.307271, -93.736082).

Demographics

2010 census
At the 2010 census there were 127 people in 42 households, including 34 families, in the city. The racial makup of the city was 99.2% White and 0.8% from two or more races. Hispanic or Latino of any race were 1.6%.

Of the 42 households 50.0% had children under the age of 18 living with them, 59.5% were married couples living together, 19.0% had a female householder with no husband present, 2.4% had a male householder with no wife present, and 19.0% were non-families. 16.7% of households were one person and 11.9% were one person aged 65 or older. The average household size was 3.02 and the average family size was 3.35.

The median age was 37.6 years. 35.4% of residents were under the age of 18; 6.4% were between the ages of 18 and 24; 21.3% were from 25 to 44; 29.2% were from 45 to 64; and 7.9% were 65 or older. The gender makeup of the city was 44.1% male and 55.9% female.

2000 census
At the 2000 census there were 134 people in 49 households, including 36 families, in the city. The racial makup of the city was 100.00% White. Hispanic or Latino of any race were 1.49%.

Of the 49 households 46.9% had children under the age of 18 living with them, 61.2% were married couples living together, 8.2% had a female householder with no husband present, and 26.5% were non-families. 24.5% of households were one person and 10.2% were one person aged 65 or older. The average household size was 2.73 and the average family size was 3.31.

The age distribution was 34.3% under the age of 18, 7.5% from 18 to 24, 32.1% from 25 to 44, 17.2% from 45 to 64, and 9.0% 65 or older. The median age was 36 years. For every 100 females, there were 94.2 males. For every 100 females age 18 and over, there were 91.3 males.

The median household income was $38,750 and the median family income  was $49,500. Males had a median income of $28,929 versus $25,313 for females. The per capita income for the city was $16,747. None of the population and none of the families were below the poverty line.

References

Cities in Warren County, Iowa
Cities in Iowa
Des Moines metropolitan area
1870 establishments in Iowa